The Singer Not the Song is a 1961 British drama film based on the 1953 novel of the same title by Audrey Erskine Lindop that was directed by Roy Ward Baker and filmed in Spain. It stars Dirk Bogarde, John Mills, and Mylène Demongeot.

Plot

A priest, Father Michael Keogh (John Mills), is sent by Rome to Quantana, a remote Mexican town which is under the control of a ruthless bandit, Anacleto Komachi (Dirk Bogarde). Anacleto is educated and intelligent, and is "down" on the Church, but he finds in Keogh a man he strangely admires and with whom he can have intelligent conversation. However, he does not allow this to distract him from his goal: to expunge the priest from his fiefdom at any cost.

Main cast
Dirk Bogarde as Anacleto Comachi
John Mills as Father Michael Keogh
Mylène Demongeot as Locha de Cortinez
Laurence Naismith as Old Uncle
John Bentley as Police Captain
Leslie French as Father Gomez
Eric Pohlmann as Presidente
Nyall Florenz as Vito
Roger Delgado as Pedro de Cortinez
Philip Gilbert as Phil Brown
Selma Vaz Dias as Chela
Laurence Payne as Pablo
Eileen Way as cigar-smoking woman
Lee Montague as taxi-driver

Production
Leo Genn bought the rights to the novel in 1954 to allow him to play the bandit. Roy Ward Baker was required to direct the film under his contract with Rank. He tried to get out of it by suggesting Luis Buñuel as director but was unsuccessful. Richard Burton was going to star in the film at one stage.

When the Rank Organisation insisted that John Mills play the priest, Dirk Bogarde became so incensed that he told director Roy Ward Baker, "I promise you, if Johnny plays the priest I will make life unbearable for everyone concerned".  The film failed at the box office, but has since developed a cult following due to its camp homosexual context and over-the-top performance by Bogarde in black leather trousers. 
Even though the story takes place in Mexico, the film was actually made in Alhaurín de la Torre, in Andalusia, Spain.

Mylène Demongeot declared in a 2016 filmed interview in Paris: "I was then shooting Upstairs and Downstairs at Shepperton Studios, the producers came by to offer me the part. I accepted immediately. I was later told that Charlton Heston had agreed upon doing it, his name was even in my contract. But when we arrived back in London to shoot, we've been told "Mr Heston no longer wants to do the film because the film shocks him", it might have been for other reasons... I was told Montgomery Clift would eventually do it, then that Marlon Brando was in talks to do it, I was therefore excited. But I saw coming up a charming little man, probably 1.60 m high man, kind, in his fifties with lovely blue eyes. But I said, is he really the man my character is supposed to be crazy about? The man whom Dirk Bogarde should be crazy [French: folle pour, tongue-in-cheek term to imply 'go gay for'] about? Uh sorry ... [Laughs]. I was about to quit but my agent told me "you'll do it anyways", so I grumbled the whole time. I struggled to project in emotional scenes with him the fact that I adored him. It proves that I am a good actress [Laughs]. He was a very good actor but I understand me, I was 23 at the time and he was an old man to me. The film remains as one of the first homosexual stories seen on screen."
Roy Ward Baker later "Dirk came to me and he said he thought he was going to be the villain he should be all in black, which is reasonable enough" and he had the trousers made in Rome. In Baker's previous film Hardy Kruger wore black leather trousers. "I didn’t know that black leather trousers were supposed to be kinky, or in some strange sexual way," said Baker. "I didn’t occur to me. Alright, so I’m naive, a BF[bloody fool], you can say what you like, but there’s no need to be so downright rude about
the picture."

Baker recalls after John Davis came to see the film, "he took me by the arm and he
said “well, I don’t quite know what you’ve done, but it’s beautiful and it is, it’s very pretty."

Reception
Baker argues the film was very popular in France, Italy and Spain. "I didn’t want to do the picture, as I say, I stuck about for about fifteen months not to make it, but I got myself into such a predicament that I was obliged to make it. I went into it with a good heart, made the best of it, gave it everything that I could and in the end, was successful. But not for me. These notices broke my heart. Looking back to 1960... it broke my nerve." 

Baker had a percentage of the profits and says he film was profitable after 23 years.<ref name="roy/">

Notes

External links

The Singer Not the Song at BFI Screenonline

1961 films
1961 Western (genre) films
Films directed by Roy Ward Baker
1960s English-language films
CinemaScope films
Films shot at Pinewood Studios
Films based on British novels
British Western (genre) films
Films about Catholic priests
Films set in Mexico
1961 drama films
Films with screenplays by Nigel Balchin
1960s British films